Dragomir Bojanić (13 June 1933 – 11 November 1993), also known by his nickname Gidra, was a Serbian actor. In several Italian films he was credited as Anthony Ghidra.

He appeared in many Yugoslav films, and even some international productions, usually playing villains.

The best known of such roles is Kondor, German secret agent in popular 1972 film Valter brani Sarajevo. He is, however, best known for the comical role of family patriarch Žika Pavlović, which he played 10 times in the Lude godine series.

Gidra died in 1993 at the age of sixty.

Theater 
He was a member of the amateur theater "Sveta Mladenović" from which he moved to Kragujevac National Theater, of which he was a longtime member. He then enrolled Academy of Theater, Film, Radio and Television and, as a first-year student, began to play Mitke at the National Theater in the play "Kostana", playing his first major role. From 1964 to 1966, he was a member of Yugoslav Drama Theater in Belgrade

Personal
Bojanić was married to Ljiljana Kontić (7 September 1931 – 17 July 2005), also an accomplished actress. They had a tumultuous marriage, marrying 3 times and divorcing twice. After remarrying for the 3rd time, they remained married until his death. They have a daughter named Jelena.

Selected filmography

References

External links

1933 births
1993 deaths
Actors from Kragujevac
Serbian male actors
Golden Arena winners
Deaths from liver cancer
Deaths from cancer in Serbia
20th-century Serbian male actors